The PBA Players Championship is one of five major tournaments on the Professional Bowlers Association (PBA) Tour. It is one of three PBA Tour major events that are open only to PBA members. (The U.S. Open and USBC Masters allow qualifying amateurs to enter.)

Tournament history
The tournament began as the PBA Touring Players Championship in 1983 and ran every PBA Tour season through 2000. There were no Players Championship events under any name from 2001 to 2010. After the tournament returned to major status in the 2016 season, the PBA voted to retroactively award major titles to the winners of the three previous Players Championship events that decade (2011, 2013, 2015), stating the tournament "is a members-only event, and includes all of the elements of a major."

Through 2020, the tournament included a maximum starting field of 92 PBA players. The top PBA members in earnings from the previous season had entry priority over the general membership, and could fill up to 82 spots. The remaining 10 spots in the starting field were filled from a ten-game pre-tournament qualifier (PTQ). The tournament format has changed over the years. The format through 2020 included 42 games of qualifying: three rounds of six games each to determine the top 24 for match play, followed by three match play rounds of eight games each. All pins from the initial 18 games carry over into the match play round, with the match play rounds adding 30 bonus pins per victory to the total pinfall in the round. The field was then cut to the top five for the televised stepladder finals.

There is no set oil pattern. The 2018 Players Championship used the 44-foot Carmen Salvino oil pattern, while the 2019 event used the 45-foot Dragon pattern. The 2020 event featured the 38-foot Wayne Webb oil pattern, named after the PBA Hall of Famer whose bowling center in Columbus, Ohio hosted this tournament from 2016 through 2020.

Revamp in 2021
The PBA announced a revamped Players Championship for the 2021 season that opens up the event to the broader PBA membership. Five Regional events are hosted first. After 28 qualifying games (7 games on each of four oil patterns), each Region holds its own stepladder finals broadcast. The five Regional winners then compete in the televised tournament finals. The five finals participants bowl a three-game set the day before the broadcast to determine seeding for the stepladder.

The Regional concept was introduced, in part, due to travel restrictions that resulted from the COVID-19 pandemic, and allowed most PBA professionals to compete in safe events closer to home.

The 2021 PBA Players Championship featured a $1 million prize fund, with a PBA record-tying $250,000 first place prize.

PBA Players Championship winners

2022 Event
The 2022 PBA Players Championship began with Regional qualifying on January 14–16 in five locations, followed by five Regional finals held January 21–23 in Euless, Texas. The televised championship finals were held on January 29, also in Euless, following a three-game seeding round earlier that day. The tournament had 326 total entries and a $565,300 prize fund, with a $100,000 top prize.

A five-player stepladder format was used for the live televised finals on January 29. Jason Belmonte won from the #2 seed position, defeating #1 seed Sean Rash in the final match. This marked Belmonte's record-increasing 14th major tournament win and 26th PBA title overall.

Final Standings:
1. Jason Belmonte (Orange, New South Wales, Australia) – $100,000
2. Sean Rash (Montgomery, Illinois) – $60,000
3. Arturo Quintero (Mexico City, Mexico) – $45,000
4. Graham Fach (Guelph, Ontario, Canada) – $35,000
5. Tommy Jones (Simpsonville, South Carolina) – $30,000

Past Champions 
Listing of all champions dating back to the inaugural 1983 Touring Players Championship.
2022: Jason Belmonte, Australia
2021: Kyle Troup, USA
2020: Bill O'Neill, USA
2019: Anthony Simonsen, USA
2018: Tom Smallwood, USA
2017: Jason Belmonte, Australia
2016: Graham Fach, Canada
2015: Parker Bohn III, USA

2014: Not held

2013: Scott Norton, USA

2012: Not held

2011: Jason Belmonte, Australia

 Not held 2001–2010

2000: Dennis Horan Jr., USA
1999: Steve Hoskins, USA
1998: Dennis Horan Jr., USA
1997: Steve Hoskins, USA
1996: Mike Aulby, USA
1995: Ernie Schlegel, USA
1994: Walter Ray Williams Jr., USA
1993: Jason Couch, USA
1992: Pete Weber, USA
1991: Dave Ferraro, USA
1990: Duane Fisher, USA
1989: Amleto Monacelli, Venezuela
1988: Dave Ferraro, USA
1987: Tom Crites, USA
1986: Mark Williams, USA
1985: Dave Husted, USA
1984: Mark Roth, USA
1983: Steve Cook, USA

References

External links
All Time Touring Players Championship Winners

Ten-pin bowling competitions in the United States